Cliff End Battery (map reference ) is a battery on the west coast of the Isle of Wight overlooking Fort Albert. It is one of the many Palmerston Forts built on the island to protect it in response to a perceived French invasion. Construction of the battery began in 1862 and was completed by 1868 at a cost of £32,714. 

No guns were mounted until 1877 when six 12.5-inch Rifled Muzzle Loading (RML) Guns and three 10-inch Rifle Muzzle Loading Guns were installed. By 1899 the RML guns had become obsolete and were removed and replaced by four 6-inch Breech Loading (BL) guns and four 4.7-inch guns. The battery was used by volunteers and Territorial Force Artillery units for practice camps.
It remained armed throughout the First and Second World Wars.

The battery was disarmed in 1951 and the site sold by the War Office in 1951. Today some of the gun emplacements remain. Much of the land is used as a site for holiday bungalows. The six 12.5-inch RML guns which were pushed over the cliff when they were dismounted after 1899 have since been recovered, with one of them now outside of Fort Albert, and two at Hurst Castle on the other side of the Needles passage. One is located at Fort Nelson, Hampshire.

References

Publications

External links
 Victorian Forts data sheet on Cliff End Battery

Forts on the Isle of Wight
Palmerston Forts
Infrastructure completed in 1868
Artillery batteries